Marianne Lake (born 1969) is a British-American former chief financial officer of the bank JPMorgan Chase. She was appointed on 20 November 2012, replacing Douglas Braunstein. Blythe Masters and Lou Rauchenberger were also considered for the role.
She is a Chartered Accountant from Institute of Chartered Accountants in England and Wales and did her bachelor's degree in physics from the University of Reading in United Kingdom.

Lake has been the chief executive officer of consumer lending at JPMorgan Chase since May 2019.

Lake has emphasized the company's role as a technological innovator.

References

Living people
JPMorgan Chase people
British accountants
American bankers
American chief executives of financial services companies
Businesspeople from Cumberland, Maryland
1969 births